White people in Hawaii, also known as Haole, are people of predominantly European descent. They form 22.9% of the population according to the 2020 United States Census. There are around 294,102 White people in Hawaii. Including people with two or more races, the number of people with some European ancestry is 476,162 (39.3%), meaning that around 14.6% of the population is mixed race.

History

British explorer James Cook was the first European to land in Hawaii on January 20, 1778. He was later murdered during a fight with a number of native Hawaiians at Kealakekua Bay after his attempt to kidnap Hawaii’s ruling chief.

Notable people

 Neil Abercrombie, the seventh Governor of Hawaii from 2010 to 2014.
 Alexander Adams, a Scotsman who served in the British Royal Navy and then came to the Hawaiian islands and served in the navy of the Kingdom of Hawaii
 Linda Lingle, the sixth Governor of Hawaii from 2002 until 2010.

See also

 European Americans
 Europeans in Oceania
 Greeks in Hawaii
 Haole
 Portuguese immigration to Hawaii
 Spanish immigration to Hawaii
 White Americans in California
 White Americans in Maryland
 White people
 Puerto Rican immigration to Hawaii

References

People from Hawaii